Cima dal Cantun is a mountain of the Bregaglia Range (Alps), located between the valleys of the Albigna and the Forno Glacier in Graubünden.

References

External links
 Cima dal Cantun on Hikr

Mountains of the Alps
Alpine three-thousanders
Mountains of Switzerland
Mountains of Graubünden
Bregaglia